Peace TV Chinese-Mandarin (occasionally written as ) is a Chinese language Islamic television network. Peace TV programs are in Mandarin and some are dubbed into English language and telecast free-to-air. The founder and president of Peace TV Chinese is Zakir Naik, Islamic preacher from Mumbai, India.

Since 29 December 2015, Peace TV Chinese channel has been telecast worldwide but mainly in Asia, Middle East and Australia. Its slogan, is a translation of the slogan used by Peace TV in English.

See also
 Iqraa TV
 Islamic TV
 Diganta Television

References

External links

Television stations in Dubai
Islamic television networks
Television channels and stations established in 2015
Chinese-language television stations
Mass media in Dubai